Reflexos da Noite (Portuguese for "Reflections of the Night") is an EP, and the first official release by the Brazilian psychedelic rock band Violeta de Outono. It came out in September 12, 1986 by now-defunct independent label Wop-Bop Records.

The track "Outono" would be re-recorded for their eponymous debut studio album in the following year.

Track listing

Personnel
 Fabio Golfetti – vocals, guitar
 Cláudio Souza – drums
 Angelo Pastorello – bass

References

External links
 Reflexos da Noite at Violeta de Outono's official Bandcamp

1986 debut EPs
Violeta de Outono albums
Portuguese-language EPs